Eucalyptus yarriambiack is a species of small, spreading tree that is only known from a single population in Victoria, Australia. It has rough, fibrous to flaky bark on the trunk, smooth bark above, narrow lance-shaped to elliptical adult leaves, flower buds in groups of seven to eleven, white flowers and hemispherical to cup-shaped fruit.

Description
It has rough, greyish brown, fibrous to flaky bark on the trunks, smooth, light grey or brownish bark above. Flowering occurs in autumn and the flowers are white.

Taxonomy and naming
Eucalyptus yarriambiack was first formally described in 2012 by Kevin James Rule in the journal Muelleria from specimens he collected in 2005 near Brim. The specific epithet (yarriambiack) refers to Yarriambiack Creek near where the species occurs and is in turn of Aboriginal origin.

Distribution and habitat
This eucalypt is only known from a single site between Brim and Beulah in a usually dry watercourse.

See also
List of Eucalyptus species

References

yarriambiack
Myrtales of Australia
Flora of Victoria (Australia)
Plants described in 2012